Église Saint-Eugène-Sainte-Cécile is a Roman Catholic church located  at 6 rue Sainte-Cécile in the 9th arrondissement of Paris. In 1983 it was designated as a monument historique in its entirety. Designed in the Neo-Gothic style by Louis-Auguste Boileau and Louis-Adrien Lusson, the church was the first in France to use an entirely iron-framed construction. The first stone was laid in 1854, and the building was completed in 1855.

History
The parish of Saint-Eugène was created in 1854 to serve the growing population of the Faubourg Poissonnière district, at the time considered a suburb of Paris. The parish was entrusted to Abbé Coquand. The abbé helped finance the construction of the parish church on a piece of land which he owned. He specified that the style should reflect that of the 13th century, a time in the history of Christianity idealised by the 19th-century French Romantic movement. In order to minimize the cost of construction and maximize the interior space on the relatively small site, the abbé also suggested an iron-framed construction, which had hitherto only been used for industrial buildings.

Louis-Adrien Lusson had been originally commissioned to design the building. It was subsequently entrusted to Louis-Auguste Boileau, although Lusson remained involved in the design of its interior. Boileau had previously written a treatise on monumental architecture in which he championed the use of iron construction. The church was completed in 20 months. The first stone was laid in June 1854 and the building was inaugurated at Christmas 1855. The church's design and iron construction provoked a controversy which was played out on the pages of the Journal des Debats in 1856 with Viollet-le-Duc accusing Boileau of being a mechanic rather than an architect and describing the church's Neo-Gothic design as a "pastiche of bad taste".

Although the church remains dedicated solely to Saint Eugène, in the 20th century the name of Saint Cecilia, the patron saint of musicians, was added to reflect the church's proximity to the Paris Conservatory. Saint-Eugène's liturgy includes Solemn High Masses sung in Latin.

Interior
Saint-Eugène's colorful interior is marked by its iron piers and mouldings painted in vivid blues, reds and greens, the mosaic tiled floor, and multiple stained glass windows. Eugène-Stanislas Oudinot created the church's set of Stations of the Cross which is the only known example realized entirely in stained glass. The large pipe organ was built by Joseph Merklin and had been exhibited at the 1855 Exposition Universelle in Paris prior to being installed in the church.

People associated with the church

Clergy associated with Saint-Eugène include Albert Le Nordez who gave conferences for Christian women there in the 1890s and Jean-Pierre Batut who was the church's pastor from 2007 to 2009.
 
Renaud de Vilbac was the church's first organist. He was succeeded by Raoul Pugno who served from 1871 until 1892. Pierre Pincemaille was titular organist between 1982 and 1987.

The wedding of Jules Verne to Honorine Morel took place at Saint-Eugène on 10 January 1857.

The funeral of Léon Battu was held at the church in 1857 as were the funerals of Louis Clapisson in 1866, Camille Corot in 1875 and Clairville in 1879.

References

External links
 

Roman Catholic churches in the 9th arrondissement of Paris
Gothic Revival church buildings in France
Roman Catholic churches completed in 1855
Monuments historiques of Paris
19th-century Roman Catholic church buildings in France